The canton of Mareuil-sur-Lay-Dissais is an administrative division of the Vendée department, western France. Its borders were modified at the French canton reorganisation which came into effect in March 2015. Its seat is in Mareuil-sur-Lay-Dissais.

It consists of the following communes:
 
L'Aiguillon-sur-Mer
Angles
Bessay
La Boissière-des-Landes
La Bretonnière-la-Claye
Le Champ-Saint-Père
Château-Guibert
Corpe
La Couture
Curzon
La Faute-sur-Mer
Le Givre
La Jonchère
Mareuil-sur-Lay-Dissais
Moutiers-les-Mauxfaits
Moutiers-sur-le-Lay
Péault
Les Pineaux
Rives-de-l'Yon
Rosnay
Saint-Avaugourd-des-Landes
Saint-Benoist-sur-Mer
Saint-Cyr-en-Talmondais
Sainte-Pexine
Saint-Vincent-sur-Graon
Le Tablier
La Tranche-sur-Mer

References

Cantons of Vendée